Sydney Lewis (October 24, 1919 – March 12, 1999) was a Virginia (USA) businessman, philanthropist and art collector  who founded the Best Products Company.

Biography
Lewis was born to a Jewish family in Richmond, Virginia, the son of an emigrant from Russia. His father sold mail-order encyclopedias to school teachers in the South. In 1940, Lewis graduated with a B.S. in business from Washington & Lee University. Though he began the study of law, he never received a law degree from Washington and Lee University as his legal education was interrupted by his service in the U.S. Army during World War II where he was sent to Harvard University for coursework in business administration. Subsequently, he finished his J.D. degree at George Washington University in Washington DC.

He practiced law for a brief period before taking over his father's encyclopedia business where he developed a catalog to promote sales. He expanded the business into appliances and, using his encyclopedia warehouse as a showroom, was able to circumvent Fair Trade laws that allowed manufacturers to set minimum retail prices.

In 1958, he incorporated the company as Best Products Co, Inc. In 1982, Best Products acquired Modern Merchandising (founded by Harold Roitenberg), then the third largest catalog retailer, in a stock transaction worth $109 million. After the merger, the now publicly-traded company had over $1 billion in sales, 10,000 employees and 100 showrooms in 11 states; and, at its peak, had $2 billion in sales and 100 showrooms in 27 states. Lewis was known for his anti-union stance and successfully fought efforts by the United Food and Commercial Workers to unionize Best Products' showrooms.

Philanthropy and political activism
Lewis is the namesake of Lewis Hall at the Washington and Lee University School of Law, whose construction he and his wife, Frances, funded in 1976. He developed a barter system with young artists in New York where they could trade art for items in the Best Products catalog. According to The New York Times, "in 1985, the couple donated more than 1,500 artworks to the museum, making it the home of the most important collection of Art Nouveau outside Paris and of an especially beautiful selection of Tiffany lamps." Lewis and his wife were benefactors of the Virginia Museum of Fine Arts in Richmond.

Lewis and his wife were supporters of the progressive candidate Henry Howell.

Personal life
In 1948, he married Frances (née Aronson) whom he had met in college. They had three children, the antiwar activist and entrepreneur Sydney Lewis Jr., Andrew Marc Lewis and Susan Lewis Butler. Marc was president and chief operating officer of Best Products and his daughter was director of the corporate foundation. Sydney and Frances Lewis were awarded the National Medal of Arts in 1987.

References

Sources
Find A Grave
Lifetime Honors - National Medal of Arts
Sydney Lewis, 79, Art Collector and Patron

Washington and Lee University alumni
1919 births
1999 deaths
Businesspeople from Richmond, Virginia
American philanthropists
20th-century American Jews
United States National Medal of Arts recipients
Washington and Lee University School of Law alumni
Jews and Judaism in Richmond, Virginia
American art curators
20th-century American businesspeople